Victodrobia is a genus of very small freshwater snails with an operculum, aquatic gastropod mollusks in the family Hydrobiidae.

Species
Species within the genus Victodrobia include:
 Victodrobia burni
 Victodrobia elongata
 Victodrobia millerae
 Victodrobia victoriensis

References

 ubio.org info on authority of the genus

 
Hydrobiidae
Taxonomy articles created by Polbot